The Witches' Water is a theme park at the middle station of the cable car at Söll in Tyrol, Austria. The central part is a water park consisting of ponds and rivulets where children can play a variety of water games. It extends over an area of about 500 meters and is complemented by various alpine restaurants, playgrounds and a petting zoo.

There are some themed trails in the surrounding area, for instance a witches' trail tracing past legends; a panoramic trail in front of the Tyrolese limestone alps; or a mile's barefoot hiking trail featuring opportunities for different kinds of sensory experience. Guests can also visit a dairy, a distillery or experience apiculture. They can also hike to the panorama restaurant at the top of the mountain.

See also
 Barefoot

External links

Witches' Water with barefoot trail
Home of the "Hexenwasser"

Amusement parks in Austria
Water parks in Austria
Tourist attractions in Tyrol (state)
Buildings and structures in Tyrol (state)